Salasar Balaji Temple  (Hindi: सालासर बालाजी धाम मंदिर) is a religious place for the devotees of Hindu god Hanuman. It is located in Salasar town (near Sujangarh) of Churu district in Rajasthan, India. Every year big fairs are organised during the months of Chaitra (March–April) and Ashwin (September - October). The Hanuman Temple is situated right in the heart of Salasar town.

Location 
Salasar is a part of Churu district in Rajasthan and is located on the Jaipur-Bikaner highway.

Establishment of temple 
A story is prevalent in the context of this temple. According to local legend, a long time ago in the village of Asota, Rajasthan, a farmer's plough collided with an object while ploughing, and stopped there. When the farmer looked, he saw some stone was there. The farmer started digging, and an idol of Balaji or Hanuman was found. At the same time the farmer's wife also came in the fields with the lunch for farmer. In his lunch his wife made the Churma of Bajra. The farmer indulge Churma to Shree Balaji Maharaj. And from the time and till now it is ritual to indulge Bajra Churma to Shree Balaji Maharaj.  The day was Tuesday and it was Navami (9th day) of Shravan month (July–August) in the bright half (first fortnight). The farmer told the people about this incident.

It is said that the landlord in that place also had a dream on the same day. In the dream, Lord Hanuman ordered him to install the idol in a Mandir in Salasar. On that same night, another person by name Mohandas - a resident of Salasar - was also ordered by Lord Hanuman in a dream to establish his presence by taking the idol from Asota to Salasar.

References 

Hindu temples in Rajasthan
Hanuman temples